William Robert "Jim" Allen  (born 22 July 1922) is a New Zealand visual artist. In the 2004 Queen's Birthday Honours, he was appointed a Member of the New Zealand Order of Merit, for services to education and the arts. In October 2007, he was awarded an honorary doctorate by Auckland University of Technology, and in 2015 he was named an Arts Foundation Icon, limited to 20 living people, by the Arts Foundation of New Zealand. Allen turned 100 in July 2022, which was celebrated by the Auckland Art Gallery in an exhibition of his works from 19 July to 28 November 2022.

Early life and war service 
Allen was born in Wellington, New Zealand. From 1940 to 1945, Allen served with the New Zealand Expeditionary Force in North Africa and Italy as a truck driver, motorcycle rider, and machine gunner.

Education 
After the end of the war, Allen studied at Perugia University and at the Instituto d' Arte Florence in Italy in 1945. In 1948 he received a Diploma of Fine Arts from the University of Canterbury in New Zealand.

Select works

Futuna Chapel 
Allen collaborated with architect John Scott on the creation of Futuna Chapel in Wellington, which opened in 1961. Allen designed the chapel's coloured perspex windows, its 14 Stations of the Cross, and the wooden crucifix wall-mounted above the altar. He also designed the "light modulators", made of rimu, glass and yellow perspex, which are installed above the entranceway to reduce afternoon sunlight entering the chapel.

Auckland Art Gallery Toi o Tamaki curator Ron Brownson called Allen's 2.5-metre high pan-cultural Christ one of the most significant wood carvings produced in New Zealand during that period. This mahogany statue of Christ was stolen from the chapel in 1999 or 2000, and recovered in 2012. It was returned to the chapel in 2013 after a restoration process. The Stations underwent conservation work in 2021.

ICI mural 
After the Futuna Chapel, Allen's work moved further away from traditional approaches and concepts. One piece, made in 1965, was a 7-meter-long work commissioned for the offices of chemical company ICI. It involved, according to Allen, ‘‘a sculptured concrete panel inspired by the micro-structure of naturally occurring copper crystals’’. The office building was badly damaged in the 2016 Kaikōura earthquake, but the mural survived the earthquake and the process of demolishing the building.

Other work 
As the 1960s continues, Allen increasingly focused on performative and non-object art.

Allen taught at Elam School of Fine Arts at the University of Auckland from 1960 until 1976.

Work by Allen has been collected by New Zealand's national museum, Te Papa.

Career 
Milestones of his career:
 1945 Studied at Perugia University and Instituto d’Arte Florence, Italy
 1948 Diploma of Fine Arts from University of Canterbury, NZ
 1949 New Zealand National Travelling Scholarship
 1951 Associate of the Royal College of Art, London
 1952-1956 New Zealand Department of Education as Field Officer to the Northern Māori Experimental Art Project
 1956-1959 New Zealand Department of Education as Liaison Organiser to secondary schools.
 1959 Stained glass windows, Our Lady of Lourdes Church, Havelock North.
 1960-1962 Lecturer, Elam School of Fine Arts, Auckland, NZ
 1961 Coloured perspex windows, Stations of the Cross and wood carved crucifix, Futuna Chapel, Wellington, NZ
 1962 Concrete and stained glass, leaded lights, Baldachin, St. John's Church, Te Awamutu, New Zealand
 1963-1968 Senior Lecturer, Elam School of Fine Arts, Auckland, NZ
 1965 Concrete mural, ICI House Wellington, NZ
 1965 Wairaka, bronze statue,and kinetic water sculpture, Whakatane, New Zealand
 1967 Conversation piece, Papuranga, Auckland, NZ

References

1922 births
Living people
People from Wellington City
New Zealand artists
20th-century New Zealand male artists
21st-century New Zealand male artists
Members of the New Zealand Order of Merit
New Zealand centenarians
Men centenarians